Aaron Graham John Collins (born 27 May 1997) is a Welsh professional footballer who plays as a striker for Bristol Rovers.

Career

Newport County
Collins was a part of the Bristol Rovers academy before joining the Newport County academy. In 2014, he nearly left the Newport academy after not being offered a scholarship. Unable to afford the costs of travelling each day, Collins took a job in McDonald's in Malpas. However, academy coach Mike Flynn later intervened and Collins was offered his first professional contract with the club soon after. Then Newport manager Jimmy Dack described Collins as "a young George Boyd".

Collins was handed his first place in a matchday squad as an unused substitute for Newport aged 17 in a League Two match versus Shrewsbury Town on 20 September 2014. Three days later, Collins made his senior debut in a Football League Trophy first round match against Swindon Town as an 11th minute replacement for Mike Flynn. However, his debut lasted just 34 minutes when the ball hit him in the face and he too had to be substituted. Swindon won the game 2–1.

In January 2015, Collins joined Merthyr Town on loan, making his only appearance as a substitute in a 2–1 win over Clevedon Town. Collins made his Football League debut on 18 April as a second-half substitute in a League Two match versus Dagenham & Redbridge. He scored his first competitive goal on 15 August in a league match versus Stevenage during a 2–2 draw. In the final week of the transfer window in August 2015, Championship side Burnley submitted two bids for Collins, the last being £65,000 plus potential future add-ons, both of which were rejected by Newport.

Wolverhampton Wanderers
On 22 January 2016, Collins signed for Wolverhampton Wanderers on a two and a half year contract for an undisclosed fee. On 31 August, Collins joined Notts County on loan until 7 January 2017. He scored a last minute equaliser on his debut against Grimsby Town to tie the game at 2–2. On 23 March, Collins joined Tranmere Rovers on loan for the remainder of the 2016–17 season. He made his debut for the club as a substitute during a 9–0 victory over Solihull Moors, scoring his side's final goal of the game.

On 29 November 2017, Collins joined Maidstone United on a one-month loan deal and on 3 January 2018, he re-joined Newport on loan for the remainder of the 2017–18 season. On 7 June, Collins joined Colchester United on loan for the 2018–19 season. He made his competitive debut on 4 August in Colchester's 0–0 draw with Notts County. His loan was terminated by mutual consent on 2 January 2019 after scoring one goal in eleven appearances for the club. In January, Collins' contract with Wolverhampton was terminated by mutual consent.

Morecambe
The following month on 9 February 2019, he signed for Morecambe until the end of the 2018–19 season. Collins scored eight goals in 15 matches for Morecambe.

Forest Green Rovers
Collins joined Forest Green Rovers on a two-year deal in June 2019. Collins was offered a new contract by the club at the end of the 2020–21 season.

Bristol Rovers
On 25 June 2021, Collins agreed to join Bristol Rovers on a two-year deal following the expiration of his contract with Forest Green. His debut came on 14 August in a 2–0 home defeat to Stevenage. On 16 November, Collins scored his first goal for the club with an incredible strike from 25 yards to make it 3–3 in the 115th minute of an FA Cup First Round Replay with Oxford United. It took until 7 December for Collins to open his league account for the club, a deflected strike in a 2–1 home defeat to Port Vale. On 22 February 2022, he scored for the third match in a row to score his tenth goal of the season in all competitions, the second in a 2–0 win over Leyton Orient. On 12 March, Collins scored a double as Rovers defeated Harrogate Town 3–0, taking his tally for the season to thirteen in all competitions, the best goalscoring season of his career. On 30 April 2022, Collins scored a first career hat-trick, including a 95th minute winner, as Rovers came from 3–1 down at Rochdale to get a vital 4–3 win to take Rovers' automatic promotion hopes to the last day of the season. On 7 May 2022, Collins scored a double as Rovers thrashed bottom of the table Scunthorpe United 7–0, this result achieving the five-goal swing Rovers needed to overtake Northampton Town to claim the final automatic promotion spot on the final day of the season on a goals scored basis.

On 29 July 2022, the eve of the beginning of the 2022–23 season, Collins signed a new two-year contract extension to his existing deal, keeping him at the club until 2025. Collins marked his new contract by scoring the equaliser the following day as Rovers fell to a late 2–1 opening day defeat to Collins' former club and fellow promoted side Forest Green Rovers. Collins was nominated for the August EFL League One Player of the Month award after scoring three goals and assisting an additional two in five matches across the month. Three goals and three assists saw Collins again nominated for both the league's and PFA Fans' Player of the Month award for October, winning the former. The day after winning the award, Collins reached the ten goal mark for the season with his side's second goal in a 2–2 draw with Fleetwood Town. Following a 2–1 victory over Cheltenham Town on 1 January 2023, in which a goal and assist for Collins took his combined goals and assists total to 23 in 25 matches, manager Barton valued him at £5 million for the upcoming January transfer window.

International
In April 2015, Collins was named in the Wales Under 19 squad for the match versus Germany on 18 April 2015 and was subsequently named in the starting line-up.

Personal life
Aaron is the elder brother of professional footballer Lewis Collins. The brothers were on opposing sides for the first time on 18 May 2021 for the League Two play off first leg match at Rodney Parade, Newport. Aaron as a striker for Forest Green Rovers and Lewis as a striker for Newport County. Newport won the match 2–0 with Lewis scoring the second goal.

Career statistics

Club

Honours
Bristol Rovers
EFL League Two third-place promotion: 2021–22

Individual
EFL League One Player of the Month: October 2022

References

External links

Footballers from Newport, Wales
1997 births
Living people
Welsh footballers
Association football defenders
Newport County A.F.C. players
Merthyr Town F.C. players
Wolverhampton Wanderers F.C. players
Notts County F.C. players
Tranmere Rovers F.C. players
Maidstone United F.C. players
Colchester United F.C. players
Morecambe F.C. players
Forest Green Rovers F.C. players
Bristol Rovers F.C. players
English Football League players
National League (English football) players
Southern Football League players